The Methuen Treaty was a military and commercial treaty between England and Portugal that was signed in 1703 as part of the War of the Spanish Succession.

The treaty stipulated that no tax higher than the tax charged for an equal amount of French wines could be charged for Portuguese wines (but see below) exported to England, and that no English textiles exported to Portugal would be charged any taxes, regardless of the geopolitical situation in each of the two nations (to ensure England would still accept Portuguese wine in periods when not at war with France).

Results of the deal were mixed. On the negative side, Portugal would not develop its industrial infrastructures (and therefore could be said to have lost the industrial race) and other types of agricultural products, since this period saw the appearance of other industries in Portugal, such as the manufacturing of porcelain. Some of the factories that appeared in this period still exist.

On the positive side, Portugal retained a strong political position on a stage that revealed itself to be fundamental in preserving the territorial integrity of its most important colony, Brazil, as argued by the Brazilian economist Celso Furtado, in his work "Brazilian Economic Foundation".

Background

At the start of the War of Spanish Succession Portugal was allied with France.  As part of this treaty, the French had guaranteed the Portuguese naval protection.  In 1702, the English navy sailed close to Lisbon on the way to and from Cadiz, proving to the Portuguese that the French could not keep their promise. They soon began negotiations with the Grand Alliance about switching sides.

There were actually two Methuen Treaties. Both were negotiated for England in Lisbon by John Methuen ( 1650–1706), who served as a member of Parliament, Lord Chancellor of Ireland, Privy Counsellor, envoy and then ambassador extraordinary to Portugal. The first, signed in May, was a military alliance that cemented allegiances in the War of Spanish Succession, and was a 4-party treaty negotiated by Karl Ernst, Graf von Waldstein for the emperor, Francisco van Schonenberg (AKA Jacob Abraham Belmonte, c.q. Francesco Belmonte) for the United Provinces, and King Pedro II for Portugal, with Methuen's son Sir Paul Methuen (1672–1757) aiding him. The second one, the more well-known trade treaty, was a 2-party treaty signed on 27 December for England by Methuen and for Portugal by Manuel Teles da Silva, 3rd Marquis of Alegrete (1682–1736).

The early years of the War of Spanish Succession, in Flanders, had been rather fruitless. The Tory Party in England was concerned about the cost of the war, and felt that naval warfare was a much cheaper option, with greater potential for success. Portugal offered the advantage of deep-water ports near the Mediterranean which could be used to counter the French Naval base at Toulon.

Treaty
There were three major elements to the Methuen Treaties. The first was the establishment of the war aims of the Grand Alliance. Secondly, the agreement meant that Spain would become a new theatre of war. Finally, it regulated the establishment of trade relations, especially between England and Portugal.

Until 1703 the Grand Alliance had never established any formal war aims. The Methuen Treaties changed this as it confirmed that the alliance would try to secure the entire Spanish Empire for Charles of Austria, the Habsburg claimant to the Spanish thrones.

The first treaty also established the numbers of troops the various countries would provide to fight the campaign in Spain. The Portuguese also insisted that Archduke Charles would come to Portugal to lead the forces in order to ensure full allied commitment to the war in Spain.

The second treaty, signed on 27 December 1703 (popularly known as the "Port Wine Treaty") helped to establish trading relations between England and Portugal. The terms of it allowed English woollen cloth to be admitted into Portugal free of duty; in return, Portuguese wines imported into England would be subject to a third less duty than wines imported from France. This was particularly important in helping the development of the port industry. As England was at war with France, it became increasingly difficult to acquire wine, and so port started to become a popular replacement.

Cypher and Dietz, in the book ″The Process of Economic Development″, say that: "Portugal specialized in a commodity that did not have the same growth potential as did cloth for England. Portugal's economy suffered consequently, as the productive structure and institutions were moulded in the direction of wine production. In fact, after trade was rapidly expanded following the Methuen Treaty in 1703, Portugal was left with a sizeable deficit as its exports to England fell short of its imports from England. The boom in Portuguese-English trade fortuitously coincided with a gold rush in Brazil, Portugal's colony, enabling the Portuguese to cover their deficit for a time with a colonial gold flow, but the benefits of specialization and trade over the longer term were illusive."

Ireland 1780s
The Kingdom of Ireland imported Portuguese wine at the low Methuen tariffs, but was banned under the Navigation Acts from exporting. In 1779, Ireland was granted "free trade", but Portugal imposed higher tariffs on Irish textile imports than on English ones, arguing it was outside the terms of the Methuen treaty. This was a tactic in Portugal's broader attempt to make Britain renegotiate the Methuen treaty. As the dispute dragged on, Ireland imposed higher tariffs on Portuguese goods, and the Irish Volunteers' 1782 Dungannon resolutions included calls for a boycott of its wines. The 1786 Eden Agreement between Britain and France caused Portugal to relent in 1787 and allow Ireland low tariffs.

References

Further reading
Francis, A.D. "John Methuen and the Anglo-Portuguese Treaties of 1703". The Historical Journal Vol. 3, No. 2, pp. 103–124.

1703 in England
1703 in Portugal
1703 treaties
18th-century military alliances
Treaties of the Kingdom of Portugal
Military alliances involving England
Military alliances involving Portugal
Commercial treaties
18th-century economic history
War of the Spanish Succession
Anglo-Portuguese treaties